Dr. Frank William "Crea" Crealock (February 11, 1925 - April 14, 2016) was the skip on the Granite Curling Club curling team (from Seattle, Washington, United States) during the World Curling Championships known as the 1961 Scotch Cup.

Early life
Crealock was born in Portage La Prairie, Manitoba in 1925, the son of William Crealock and Kathleen Beckett. He graduated from the medical school at the University of Manitoba and was trained as an obstetrician-gynecologist at the University of Iowa. While in the United States, he joined the United States Air Force in the mid-1950s as an officer, becoming a flight surgeon stationed at Bergstrom Air Force Base in Austin, Texas. Following his military service, he moved to Seattle where he established an obstetrician-gynecologist practise.

Curling career
Crealock led his team to a gold medal at the 1961 US National Championship in Grand Forks, North Dakota, finishing with a record of 6–2.

Personal life
Crealock was married and had five children.

References

External links

1925 births
2016 deaths
American male curlers
American curling champions
Sportspeople from Portage la Prairie
Canadian emigrants to the United States
Sportspeople from Seattle
University of Iowa alumni
University of Manitoba alumni
United States Air Force Medical Corps officers
American obstetricians
American gynecologists